Punctoterebra lineaperlata is a species of sea snail, a marine gastropod mollusk in the family Terebridae, the auger snails.

Description
The length of the shell attains 32.5 mm.

Distribution
This marine species occurs off Vanuatu.

References

 Terryn Y. & Holford M. (2008) The Terebridae of Vanuatu with a revision of the genus Granuliterebra, Oyama 1961. Visaya Supplement 3: 1-96.

External links
 Fedosov, A. E.; Malcolm, G.; Terryn, Y.; Gorson, J.; Modica, M. V.; Holford, M.; Puillandre, N. (2020). Phylogenetic classification of the family Terebridae (Neogastropoda: Conoidea). Journal of Molluscan Studies

Terebridae
Gastropods described in 2008